Campomaggiore is a town and comune in the province of Potenza,  Basilicata, southern Italy. It includes a modern settlement which has replaced the original town Campomaggiore Vecchio, destroyed by an avalanche in 1885 and now a ghost town.

Twin towns
 Cesano Maderno, Italy

References

Cities and towns in Basilicata
Ghost towns in Italy